Time to Die is an album by indie folk trio The Dodos. It was produced by Phil Ek. The album leaked to the internet on July 8, 2009.

Track listing

"Small Deaths" – 5:19
"Longform" – 4:39
"Fables" – 4:18
"The Strums" – 4:47
"This Is a Business" – 4:39
"Two Medicines" – 5:27
"Troll Nacht" – 6:23
"Acorn Factory" – 4:04
"Time to Die" – 6:16

Bonus Tracks: iTunes
"Company" – 5:05

Personnel
Meric Long – vocals, guitar
Logan Kroeber – drums, percussion

Additional Personnel
Keaton Snyder – vibraphone
Anna Hillburg – trumpet on 4

References

2009 albums
Frenchkiss Records albums
The Dodos albums
Albums produced by Phil Ek